Wade in the Water is a 2019 American drama film directed by Mark Wilson, his directorial debut, written by Chris Retts, and starring Tom E. Nicholson and Danika Golombek. The plot revolves around a man whose solitary life is interrupted when he receives a neighbor's package bearing a horrifying secret.

Plot
Sure, our man has a name, but he never gives it. He works from home. His neighbors are all idiots. He doesn't really "do" friends. But all that changes when a mis-delivered package arrives in his post office box bearing a horrifying secret—one that will set him on a collision course with a predator, the man's disillusioned daughter, and his own dark past.

Cast

Reception
Stephen King praised the movie on his Twitter account saying;

References

External links
 
 
 

2010s English-language films